U.S. Route 30 or U.S. Highway 30 (US 30) is an east–west main route in the system of the United States Numbered Highways, with the highway traveling across the northern tier of the country. The western end of the highway is at US 101 in Astoria, Oregon; the eastern end is at Virginia Avenue, Absecon Boulevard, and Adriatic Avenue in Atlantic City, New Jersey. The "0" as the last digit in the number indicates that it is a coast-to-coast route and a major east-west route. Despite long stretches of parallel and concurrent Interstate Highways, it has not been decommissioned unlike other long haul routes such as US 66. It is also the only U.S. Highway that has always been coast-to-coast since the beginning of U.S. Route system.

US 20 and US 30 break the general U.S. Route numbering rules in Oregon, since US 20 actually starts south of US 30 in Newport, running through the middle of Oregon, while US 30 runs parallel to the north of the state (the Columbia River and Interstate 84). The two run concurrently and continue in the correct positioning near Caldwell, Idaho. This is because US 20 was not a planned coast-to-coast route while US 30 was.

Much of the historic Lincoln Highway, the first road across the United States (from New York City to San Francisco), became part of US 30; it is still known by that name in many areas.

Route description

|-
|OR
|477.47
|768.41
|-
|ID
|415.55
|668.77
|-
|WY
|454.37
|731.24
|-
|NE
|451
|726
|-
|IA
|330.43
|531.77
|-
|IL
|151.32
|243.53
|-
|IN
|151.8
|244.3
|-
|OH
|245.39
|394.92
|-
|WV
|3.4
|5.5
|-
|PA
|324
|521
|-
|NJ
|58.26
|93.76
|-
|Total
|3064
|4930
|}

Oregon

It heads east to Portland, where it uses a short section of freeway built for the canceled Interstate 505. From there it heads around the north side of downtown on Interstate 405 and Interstate 5 to reach Interstate 84 (I‑84).

Idaho

Upon entering Idaho, US 30 runs along its old surface route through Fruitland and New Plymouth before joining I‑84. It leaves at Bliss and soon crosses the Snake River, running south of it through Twin Falls and Burley before crossing it again and rejoining I‑84. At the split with Interstate 86 (I‑86), US 30 continues east with I‑86 almost to its end at Pocatello. US 30 cuts southeast through downtown Pocatello to Interstate 15, where it heads south to McCammon. There it exits and heads east and southeast into Wyoming, not paralleling an Interstate highway for the first time since Portland.

Wyoming
In Wyoming, US 30 heads southeast through Kemmerer to Granger, where it joins Interstate 80 across the southern part of the state. It is also here that it joins the historic Lincoln Highway. As in the previous two states, US 30 remains with the Interstate highway for most of its path, only leaving for the old route in the following places:
  from Walcott to Laramie
  through Cheyenne
  through Pine Bluffs to the Nebraska state line

Nebraska

Unlike the three states to the west, Nebraska keeps US 30 completely separate from its parallel Interstates (Interstate 80 [I‑80] in this case). From the state line to Grand Island, US 30 closely parallels I‑80. East of Grand Island, US 30 diverges from I‑80 and runs northeast towards Columbus on a highway parallel to the Platte River. At Columbus, it turns east towards Schuyler and Fremont and crosses the Missouri River into Iowa east of Blair.

Iowa

Between Missouri Valley and Denison, US 30 runs in a southwest-to-northeast direction. Several freeway bypasses have been built around the major cities on US 30 - Ames, Marshalltown, Tama, Cedar Rapids, Mt. Vernon and DeWitt. It crosses the Mississippi River into Illinois on the Gateway Bridge at Clinton.

U.S. Route 30S and U.S. Route 30A are two previous alternate alignments of US 30 in Iowa. They followed the original alignment of US 30 in the state. They both began in Nebraska, entered Iowa in Council Bluffs, and extended north to Missouri Valley via Crescent to meet the current highway.

Illinois

US 30 heads east in Illinois to Rock Falls, where it begins to parallel Interstate 88. At Aurora it turns southeast to Joliet, where it is a major thoroughfare in the city of Joliet (Plainfield Road), and then back east through New Lenox, Frankfort, Mokena, Matteson, Olympia Fields, Park Forest, Chicago Heights, Ford Heights, and Lynwood to the Indiana state line, bypassing Chicago to the south. Notwithstanding, the original 1926 routing of US 30 ran directly through downtown Chicago.

Indiana

US 30 in Indiana is a major rural divided highway. It is not a freeway except at Fort Wayne, where it runs around the north side on Interstate 69 (I‑69) and Interstate 469. Between Interstate 65 (at Merrillville) and I‑69 (Fort Wayne), there are over 40 traffic signals on this divided highway, hindering smooth traffic flow. This is especially pronounced near Warsaw and Columbia City, where the speed limit is reduced as the highway runs through a commercial section with many businesses and traffic signals. It is, however, a four lane divided road through its entirety within Indiana, generally avoiding small towns. Speed limits range, but are generally .

Ohio

US 30 continues into Ohio, where it is mainly a four-lane divided highway until  Canton. A proposal to make US 30 a limited access freeway from Trump Avenue and SR 11 was set in 2019 and federal funding set $18 million to construct the new freeway. As of 2020, the only sections that were limited access freeways are in Van Wert, Bucyrus, Mansfield, Wooster and Canton. A section between I-71 and US 250 is a divided four-lane highway. A section between SR 57 and SR 172 is a four-lane divided highway, with traffic signals at two intersections. The highway passes through Van Wert. After Van Wert it travels through Upper Sandusky where, the highway runs concurrently with US 23. The section between Mansfield and Canton follows the old Lincoln Highway. The last remaining segments that will be upgraded to a freeway are past Canton; currently, the highway is a two-lane route that passes through East Canton, Minerva and Lisbon. Designated with signs marking routes SR 11, SR 7, SR 39, and US 30.

West Virginia

It crosses the Ohio River over the Jennings Randolph Bridge, continuing the freeway from the Ohio section. After cutting through the town of Chester with only one interchange, West Virginia Route 2 (Carolina Avenue), the freeway section ends not too long after. US 30 continues across the northernmost piece of the Northern Panhandle on a two-lane road.

Pennsylvania

US 30 heads southeast into Pennsylvania, joining US 22 and then the Penn-Lincoln Parkway West west of Pittsburgh. It heads through downtown Pittsburgh on Interstate 376/US 22, leaving at Wilkinsburg for its own alignment. From there it roughly parallels the Pennsylvania Turnpike (Interstate 76 [I‑76]) to the Philadelphia area, though in many areas, particularly from York past Lancaster, and bypassing Coatesville, Downingtown, and Exton, it is far enough from the Pennsylvania Turnpike to require its own freeway. As it approaches Philadelphia, US 30 constitutes the main road of the Philadelphia Main Line, a string of affluent suburbs west of the city; often called Lancaster Avenue and Lancaster Pike through this stretch. US 30 then briefly joins I‑76 near Center City Philadelphia, splitting onto Interstate 676 as it crosses the Delaware River on the Benjamin Franklin Bridge.

New Jersey

US 30 splits from Interstate 676 just east of the Ben Franklin Bridge toll plaza in Camden and heads southeast to Atlantic City, generally parallel to the Atlantic City Expressway, passing through the New Jersey Pine Barrens. For most of its New Jersey run, it is known as the White Horse Pike.

History

US 30 was originally proposed to run from Salt Lake City, Utah to Atlantic City, New Jersey. West of Philadelphia, Pennsylvania, this was designated largely along the Lincoln Highway, as part of a promise to the Lincoln Highway Association to assign a single number to their road as much as possible. West of Salt Lake City, U.S. Route 40 continued to San Francisco, California, although it ran farther north than the Lincoln Highway east of Wadsworth, Nevada and west of Sacramento, California.

The governments of Idaho and Oregon objected to Salt Lake City as the terminus for US 30 and requested extensions. What is now US 30 through those states (west of Burley, Idaho) had been designated as part of U.S. Route 20, another transcontinental route, but traveled through Yellowstone National Park and was inaccessible during the winter season. The states agreed to take US 30 along that route, splitting from the route to Salt Lake City at Granger, Wyoming and running along what had been designated as U.S. Route 530 (US 530). (That number was then reused for the spur towards Salt Lake City.) The planned US 530 had ended at U.S. Route 91 at McCammon, Idaho, where the new US 30 turned north to Pocatello, meeting the planned US 20. (US 20 was truncated to Yellowstone but later extended along its own route to the Pacific Ocean.) What had been designated as U.S. Route 630 (US 630), from US 30 at Echo, Utah to Ogden, Utah, was to be extended east on former US 30 to US 30 at Granger and northwest on US 91 and what had been designated U.S. Route 191 to US 30 at Burley.

Utah objected to that plan, however, as it removed US 30 from that state, giving them only US 630, a branch. A compromise was reached, in which the US 630 route would become the main line of US 30, once improved to higher standards, but that was still not deemed completely satisfactory. Ultimately, in the final system, a split was approved between Burley, Idaho and Granger, Wyoming, with U.S. Route  30N running along the modern routing US 30, and U.S. Route 30S taking the route through Utah (planned as US 630). In the final plan (dated November 11, 1926), the route towards Salt Lake City became U.S. Route 530, ending at U.S. Route 40 at Kimball Junction, Utah.

Around 1931, a split in Ohio was designated, from Delphos east to Mansfield. The original US 30 was assigned U.S. Route 30S (US 30S), and a straighter route became U.S. Route 30N (US 30N). US 30S was eliminated ca 1975, putting US 30 on former US 30N.

US 30 was rerouted ca 1931 to bypass Omaha, Nebraska and Council Bluffs, Iowa to the north. The former route, from Fremont, Nebraska to Missouri Valley, Iowa, was designated U.S. Route 30S. Around 1934 it was truncated to Omaha and c. 1939 it was changed from US 30S to US 30A and was removed from service in 1969 when the historic Douglas Street bridge was demolished. Later sections were relocated to parallel Interstate Highways in several states, including I-84 in Oregon and Idaho.

A signed US 30 Bypass was created in Portland, Oregon, beginning at the St. John's bridge, following (roughly) Lombard Street in North Portland, continuing along Sandy Boulevard, and rejoining the I-84|/US 30 route in the center of the town of Wood Village. Portland also had a U.S. 30 Business route along N.E. Sandy Boulevard, however the route was decommissioned in 2007.

In 1988 Pennsylvania Department of Transportation (PennDOT) engineers proposed that US 30 be rerouted and upgraded to a four-lane controlled-access expressway through a portion of Lancaster County. The American Farmland Trust (AFT) opposed the plan because, according to Jim Riggle, then Director of Operations at AFT, it "would have cut right through the heart of the best farmland [and] would probably have been the death knell of the Amish community."  The plans were averted when more than a thousand Old Order Amish, people who do not usually participate in the public process, "drove their buggies to the meeting hall and expressed their concern by simply sitting quietly in the audience in their black homespun suits."

Major intersections

Oregon
  in Astoria
  in Portland. The highways travel concurrently through the city.
  in Portland. I-5/US 30 travel concurrently through the city.
  in Portland. I-84/US 30 travel concurrently to Cascade Locks.
  in Portland
  in Portland
  in Portland
  in Cascade Locks. The highways travel concurrently to Hood River.
  in Hood River. The highways travel concurrently to Mosier.
  in The Dalles
  in The Dalles. The highways travel concurrently through the city.
  in The Dalles. I-84/US 30 travel concurrently to Pendleton.
  east-northeast of The Dalles
  east of Boardman
  southwest of Hermiston
  in Stanfield. The highways travel concurrently to Pendleton.
  in Gopher Flats. The highways travel concurrently to La Grande.
  southeast of La Grande. The highways travel concurrently to North Powder.
  in Baker City. The highways travel concurrently to south of Fruitland, Idaho.
Idaho
  south of Fruitland. US 30/US 95 travel concurrently to Palisades Corner.
  south of New Plymouth. The highways travel concurrently to west-northwest of Bliss.
  north of Caldwell. The highways travel concurrently to Caldwell.
  in Boise.
  in Boise. US 20/US 30 travel concurrently to Mountain Home. US 26/US 30 travel concurrently to west-northwest of Bliss.
  east of Filer. The highways travel concurrently to Twin Falls.
  in Heyburn. The highways travel concurrently to northeast of Declo.
  northeast of Declo. I-86/US 30 travel concurrently to west of Chubbuck.
  in Pocatello. The highways travel concurrently to northwest of McCammon.
  in Pocatello. The highways travel concurrently to northwest of McCammon.
  in Montpelier. The highways travel concurrently through the city.
Wyoming
  in Kemmerer
  in Little America. The highways travel concurrently to south-southeast of Walcott.
  in Purple Sage. The highways travel concurrently to Rock Springs.
  east of Rawlins. The highways travel concurrently to Laramie.
  southeast of Laramie. The highways travel concurrently to southwest of Cheyenne.
  in Cheyenne
  in Cheyenne
  east-northeast of Cheyenne. The highways travel concurrently to Pine Bluffs.
Nebraska
  in Sidney. The highways travel concurrently to Chappell.
  north of Big Springs
  west-southwest of Ogallala. The highways travel concurrently to Ogallala.
  in North Platte
  in Lexington
  in Grand Island
  south of Columbus. The highways travel concurrently to Columbus.
  north of Fremont. US 30/US 275 travel concurrently to east-northeast of Fremont.
  in Blair. The highways travel concurrently through the city.
Iowa
  in Missouri Valley
  in Denison. The highways travel concurrently through the city.
  in Carroll
  on the Amaqua–Beaver township line. The highways travel concurrently to Ogden.
  in Ames
  southeast of Ames
  in Colo
  in Toledo
  in Fremont Township. The highways travel concurrently to Cedar Rapids.
  in Cedar Rapids. The highways travel concurrently to Bertram Township.
  in Cedar Rapids
  in De Witt. The highways travel concurrently to southwest of De Witt.
  in Clinton. The highways travel concurrently through the city.
Illinois
  southeast of Rock Falls
  north of Amboy
  southwest of Lee
  in Oswego. The highways travel concurrently to Montgomery.
  in Joliet
  in Joliet. The highways travel concurrently through the city.
  in New Lenox
  in Frankfort
  in Matteson
Indiana
  in Schererville
  in Merrillville
  in Wanatah
  in Davis Township
  east of Plymouth
  in Fort Wayne. The highways travel concurrently through the city.
  in Fort Wayne. I-69/US 30 travel concurrently through the city.
  in Fort Wayne
  north-northeast of Fort Wayne. The highways travel concurrently to New Haven.
  northeast of New Haven. The highways travel concurrently to New Haven.
Ohio
  in Pleasant Township. The highways travel concurrently to Van Wert.
  north of Van Wert
  in Madison Township
  in Salem Township. The highways travel concurrently to Crane Township.
  in Madison Township
  in Mifflin Township
  in Plain Township. The highways travel concurrently to Wooster Township.
  in Massillon. The highways travel concurrently to Canton.
  in Canton
 from West Point to West Virginia state line
West Virginia
  in Chester
Pennsylvania
  in North Fayette Township. The highways travel concurrently to Wilkinsburg.
  in Robinson Township. The highways travel concurrently to Wilkinsburg.
  southwest of Pennsbury Village
  in Pittsburgh.
  in Pittsburgh
  in North Huntingdon Township
  in Southwest Greensburg
  in Jenner Township
  in Bedford Township
  in Breezewood. The highways travel concurrently through the town.
  in Todd Township
  in Chambersburg
  in Chambersburg
  in Straban Township
  in Manchester Township
  in Manheim Township. The highways travel concurrently through the township.
  in Caln Township
  in West Whiteland Township
  in Radnor Township
  on the Lower Merion Township–Philadelphia line
  in Philadelphia. The highways travel concurrently through the city.
  in Philadelphia. I-676/US 30 travel concurrently to Camden, New Jersey.
  in Philadelphia
New Jersey
  in Pennsauken Township. The highways travel concurrently to Collingswood.
  in Barrington
  in Hammonton
  in Absecon
 Virginia Avenue/Absecon Boulevard/Adriatic Avenue in Atlantic City

Special routes

US 30 has had multiple alternate routes during it existence, but all have been finally eliminated. Although several business loops of US 30 have been decommissioned as well, nearly a dozen remain. In addition to these business loops, there is also one bypass, one emergency route, and one business alternate truck route.

Related routes
  in New Jersey
  (former) in Pennsylvania
  (former) in Illinois
  (former) in Illinois
  (former) in Utah
  (former) in Oregon
  in Oregon and Washington
  (former) in Washington

See also

 List of United States Numbered Highways
 Lincoln Highway

References

External links

 Endpoints of U.S. Route 30 on usends.com
 Speed Limits for U.S. Route 30 in New Jersey

 
30
30
30
Interstate 80
Interstate 84 (Oregon–Utah)
1926 establishments in the United States